Ghana Railway Corporation operates the railways of Ghana.  The Ghana Railway Company Limited is a public-sector body with responsibility for the efficient management of the national rail system so as to enhance the smooth movement of goods and passengers.

History 

Operations began in 1898 under the Gold Coast Government Railways with headquarters in Sekondi. The headquarters were transferred to Takoradi after the building of Takoradi Harbour, and railways and ports were jointly administered as the Ghana Railway & Ports Authority. In 1976, SMCD 95 separated the railway from ports as the Ghana Railway Corporation. The company enjoyed the status of a public corporation until 19 March 2001, when it became a limited liability company.

The original  Eastern Railway was built in 1923 by the British for the purpose of hauling minerals and cocoa. Construction of the Ghana Railways started before there were any port facilities, and locomotives and other equipment had to be lightered over the beach.

In 2010, a contract was signed to construct a railway from Paga (on the border with Burkina Faso) to Kumasi; plus a branch from Tamale to Yendi.

The railway network in Ghana resembles a large capital "A" with 3 components - a "Western Division" (the left leg of the "A") from Secondi/Takoradi to Kumasi (280 km, 168 mi), an "Eastern Division" (the right leg of the "A") from Accra to Kumasi, and a "Central Division" (the horizontal bar of the "A") from Huni Valley to Kotoku.  The 953 km (570 mi) network includes branch lines on the "Western Division" to Prestea and Awaso, a branch line to Kade on the "Central Division", and branch lines to Tema and Shai Hills on the "Eastern Division".

Very little of the railway network remains in operation.  Accra to Tema, Accra to Kotoku, and Awaso to Dunkwa and south to Takoradi are the only parts that are known to be in operation.  Very little is known about the current operating state of the rest of the system.

The following table outlines the dates of construction of the various parts of the railway network.  (See map below right.)  
 

Note 1 - Tarkwa to Prestea is a branch line on the Western Division that services manganese mines.

Note 2 - Kojokrom is the junction of the line to Secondi (now abandoned).  The other leg serves the port of Takoradi.

Note 3 - Dunkwa to Awaso is a branch line on the Western Division that services bauxite mines.

Note 4 - Huni Valley (Tinkwakrom) is the junction of the Central Division with the Western Division.

Note 5 - Achiasi to Kade is now a branch line on the Central Division.  It used to service timber companies and for cocoa transportation. Oda was an important station on this branch.

Note 6 - Kotoku is the junction of the Central Division with the Western Division.

Stations 
The following table lists some of the stations and flagstops (halts) that existed at one time on the three Divisions.  There may be more.  In the latter days of operation on these lines, very few of them were in service.

Note 1 - No passenger service.

Note 2 -

Note 3 - Station/stop may no longer be in service.

Standards 

 Railway coupling - AAR coupler
 Brake (railway) - Air brake  

 axleload - 25T

Single and double track 

Gauge 
Railway gauge is currently 3'6". As an interim position, dual gauge sleepers are being installed to facilitate the conversion to Standard Gauge.

Concession 
Over five years a  line is to be constructed from Awaso to Hamile near the border with Burkina Faso. The government awarded a US$1.4 billion concession for the Eastern Railway to Peatrack earlier in the year.

New Suburban Services 
In March 2015 it was announced that a new suburban service linking Sekondi and Takoradi would begin by the end of 2015. The US$100 million project, managed by Amanda Holdings, involves the rebuilding of 30 of 1067mm gauge track to standard gauge, and the acquisition of two DMUs for service.  The Accra - Nsawam and Kumasi - Ejisu suburban lines are also to be rebuilt.

Timeline

2007 
In July 2007, contract signed as part of the ECOWAS rail plan, intended to link Ghana to Burkina Faso.

2008 
Two diesel multiple units ordered from China CNR Corporation's Tangshan plant for a shuttle service from Accra to Tema. Each unit comprises two motor cars with Vossloh Kiepe and Voith traction equipment, plus four trailer cars.

2010 
In October 2010 the DMUs were launched. The line was commissioned in October 2010; in December 2010, work began on an extension to Tema harbour.

2022 
In september GRC ordered two DMU from Pesa with option on ten additional.

Towns served by rail

Concrete sleepers 

A plant to manufacture concrete sleepers is to be set up in 2008 at the strategic railway junction at Huni Valley.

Rolling Stock

See also 
 Rail transport in Ghana
 Transport in Ghana

References

External links 
 Ministry of Transportation
 Railways in Ghana (photos)
 Addresses
 Rethinking rail
 Ghana Railway Corporation Managing Director
 Rehabilitation of railway line on course MyJoyOnline 16 March 2007
 Development; Inland port
 Ghana Railways at Ghana-Net
 Ghana Railways - Accra Station pictures
 Ghana revival starts as concessions are signed Railway Gazette International 10 September 2007
 Overview from Railway Gazette International
 The Railways Of Ghana - 2007
 Ghana Railways In 2003
 A History Of The Railways Of Ghana Circa 1930, Complete With Period Photos
 A Look At The Railways Of Ghana In 1914 Through The Eyes Of A British Reporter (Complete With Period Construction Photos

Railway companies of Ghana
3 ft 6 in gauge railways in Ghana